William Cravens may refer to:
 William B. Cravens (1872–1939), US Congressman from Arkansas
 William Fadjo Cravens (1899–1974), US Congressman from Arkansas, son of the above

See also
William Craven (disambiguation) (similar name)